KNSG (107.5 FM, "107.5 The Fan") is a radio station broadcasting a sports format serving Marshall, Minnesota. The station is currently owned by Linder Radio Group.

History
KBJJ changed its call letters to KARZ, and switched from country to classic rock in 1997 following being purchased by KMHL/KKCK. 107.5 KARZ later segued into a mainstream rock format around 2000.

On October 16, 2017, 107.5 FM and 94.7 FM swapped their call letters: 94.7 FM changed their call letters to KARZ and 107.5 FM changed their call letters to KNSG. 94.7 FM rebranded their classic hits format with the KARZ call letters.

On October 30, 2017, KNSG changed their format from rock to sports, branded as "The Fan". (info taken from )

Previous logo
 (Station's logo under previous KARZ calls)

References

External links
KNSG official website

Radio stations in Minnesota
Sports radio stations in the United States
Radio stations established in 1986
1986 establishments in Minnesota